Ken Jones (born 26 April 1934) is a former Australian rules footballer who played with Fitzroy in the Victorian Football League (VFL).

Jones was recruited from Heidelberg, in the Diamond Valley Football League (DVFL). In both 1958 and 1960, he appeared in all 19 games, including a semi final.

A defender, he returned to the DVFL after leaving Fitzroy and twice won the league's best and fairest award. His first win was in 1962, at Montmorency. He was joint winner with Graham Campbell in 1966, this time playing for Diamond Creek.

References

1934 births
Australian rules footballers from Victoria (Australia)
Fitzroy Football Club players
Heidelberg Football Club players
Montmorency Football Club players
Diamond Creek Football Club players
Living people